Walter Leroy Moody Jr. (March 24, 1935 – April 19, 2018) was an American convicted murderer who was sentenced to death and executed in Alabama for the 1989 letter bomb murder of Robert S. Vance, a U.S. federal judge serving on the Court of Appeals for the 11th Circuit.

When Moody was executed by lethal injection in April 2018, he became the oldest death row inmate to be executed since the death penalty was reinstated in 1976.

Background 
Moody was born on March 24, 1935, in Rex, Georgia, and grew up in Fort Valley. He grew up as the oldest of three children and spent much of his time "tinkering with machinery". He graduated from Peach County High School in 1953, and held a multitude of military positions in the years to 1961.

Following his departure from the military, Moody resumed his education. Taking classes at a small college, he considered becoming a neurosurgeon but he did not make good grades. He was later able to take some law school classes. After a psychiatric evaluation in 1967, he was characterized as harboring violent thoughts, and the doctor evaluating him, Thomas M. Hall, testified that he was ''constantly afraid'' that Moody might get into a situation that would end up in ''some sort of destruction toward society.''

On May 7, 1972, Moody's wife at the time, Hazel, opened a package she found in their kitchen. It turned out to be a homemade pipe bomb that exploded in front of her, tearing up her hand, thigh and shoulder, and sending scrap metal into her eye. She required six operations to deal with all of her injuries. Moody was tried for making the bomb with intent to send it to an auto dealer who had repossessed Moody's car, and on October 19, 1972, he was found not guilty of making the bomb, but was convicted of possessing it and sentenced to five years in the Atlanta Federal Penitentiary.

Moody and his wife were divorced shortly after his conviction.

Vance's murder and connected bombings 
On December 16, 1989, federal judge Robert Vance was assassinated at his home in Mountain Brook, Alabama, when he opened a package containing a makeshift pipe bomb. Vance died instantly and his wife, Helen, was seriously injured. After an extensive investigation, Moody and his second wife, Susan McBride, were arrested on July 13, 1990. McBride was released on $250,000 bail within a week and later testified against Moody pursuant to an immunity agreement.

Moody was charged with the murders of Judge Vance and of Robert E. Robinson, a black civil-rights attorney based in Savannah, Georgia, who had been killed in a separate explosion at his office two days later on Monday, December 18, 1989. Moody was also charged with mailing bombs that were defused at the Eleventh Circuit Court's headquarters in Atlanta and at the Jacksonville, Florida, office of Willye Dennis of the NAACP.

Louis J. Freeh, who prosecuted the federal case at Robert Mueller’s behest, said that the bombings at the offices of both Robinson and the NAACP were meant to deflect attention away from Moody. Moody's killing of Vance and his attempted bombing of the Eleventh Circuit were motivated by the Court's refusal to expunge Moody's conviction for the 1972 explosion in his home, despite the fact that Vance was neither on the panel that made that decision, nor was he responsible for its decision.

Trial, death row, and execution 
After an order was entered directing the recusal of all circuit and district judges within the Eleventh Circuit, Moody's trial for murder and related crimes was presided over by Judge Edward Devitt, of the District of Minnesota. After a successful prosecution by special prosecutors Louis J. Freeh and Howard Shapiro, Moody was convicted on all counts. He was sentenced to seven federal life terms. An Alabama state-court jury later convicted Moody of Judge Vance's murder; Moody was sentenced to death by electrocution in 1997. He stayed on death row at the Holman Correctional Facility near Atmore, Alabama, from February 13, 1997.

Moody was alleged to have attempted to run a Ponzi scheme from death row some time around 2015, according to an anonymous elderly Florida woman who claimed to have received a letter with a Holman Correctional Facility return address from Moody—although Moody was not known to have faced any disciplinary action as a result.

On February 23, 2018, an execution date for Moody was set for April 19, 2018. He was subsequently executed on this date, at 8:42 p.m. Aged 83 years and 26 days at execution, he was the oldest inmate executed in the United States in the post-Furman era, surpassing the previous record set by the execution of John B. Nixon Sr., who was executed in Mississippi in December 2005 at the age of 77 years, 8 months and 13 days. He declined to make a final statement and his last meal was Philly cheesesteaks, Dr Pepper, and M&M's.

Popular culture 
The case was featured in the episode "Deadly Delivery" of Forensic Files which first aired on October 29, 1998. It was also featured in the episode "Living in Terror" of The New Detectives.

See also 
 Capital punishment in Alabama
 List of people executed in Alabama
 List of people executed in the United States in 2018

References

External links 	
  (6:43)

1935 births
2018 deaths
American people executed for murder
Bombers (people)
People convicted of murder by Alabama
People from Clayton County, Georgia
People from Fort Valley, Georgia
People executed by Alabama by lethal injection
21st-century executions by Alabama
Military personnel from Georgia (U.S. state)